The Sierra Vista Unified School District is the school district for Sierra Vista, Arizona. It operates Buena High School, Joyce Clark Middle School, and six elementary schools in its service area.

The district serves high school aged dependent children on Fort Huachuca.

Demographics
According to the National Center for Education Statistics, Sierra Vista Unified School District serves a community of 48,526 people with a Median Household Income of $59,450.

22.4% of the families in the Sierra Vista USD live below the poverty level. Total households in the community is 20,382.

Race/Ethnicity of Sierra Vista USD:
 White: 57%
 Hispanic or Latino (of any race): 28%
 Black: 5%
 Asian: 4%
 American Indian/Alaskan Native: 1%
 Hawaiian and Other Pacific Islander: 1%
 Two or More Races: 4%

Schools
Secondary schools:
 Buena High School
 Joyce Clark Middle School

Elementary schools:
 Bella Vista Elementary School
 Carmichael Elementary School
 Huachuca Mountain Elementary School
 Pueblo Del Sol Elementary School
 Town & Country Elementary School
 Village Meadows Elementary School

See also
 List of school districts in Arizona

Notes

External links
 Official website

School districts in Cochise County, Arizona
Sierra Vista, Arizona
1956 establishments in Arizona
School districts established in 1956